William Charles Gotshall (May 9, 1870 - August 20, 1935) was an American civil engineer known for his research on engineering economics in civil engineering published as Notes of electric railway economics and preliminary engineering (1903, 1904). He was also responsible for the conversion of the Second Avenue Railroad in New York from horses to conduit electrical power in 1897-1898.

Early life and career
William Charles Gotshall, was born in St. Louis, Mo., on May 9, 1870, the son of Daniel H. Gotshall (1844-1909) and Minnie Wortmann Gotshall (1845-1918).
He married Adelaide von Rathgen on September 15, 1897.

Military service
Gotshall was commissioned as a Major of Engineers in the New York Guard in June 1917 and discharged in 1920.
His service consisted of surveying, locating and constructing military roads as well as assisting in railroad design and camp layouts.

Bibliography
 Notes on electric railway economics and preliminary engineering. New York: McGraw Publ. Co.. (1903). Accessed at 
 Railway (Electric) Economics (article), Beach, Frederick Converse, and George Edwin Rines, eds. The encyclopedia americana. Vol. 10. New York: Americana Company, 1904.

Death and legacy
Gotshall died in New City on August 20, 1935, and was interred at Woodlawn Cemetery in the Bronx, New York City.

The Gotshall collection
At the time of his death in 1935, Gotshall possessed an extensive collection of books and in his will left this collection to the New York State Library, one of the largest in the world.

See also
Engineering economics (civil engineering)

References

Sources
 Gotshall, William Charles. Marquis Who Was Who in America 1607-1984, edited by Marquis Who's Who, Marquis Who's Who LLC, 1st edition, 2009. Credo Reference, Accessed 26 Oct. 2018.
 Gotshall, William Charles (article) Missouri Biographical Dictionary, Jan Onofrio, Somerset Publishers, Inc., (2001)  
 The Gotshall collection in the New York State Library. New York State Library. (1960)

External links
 New York State Library biographies with Gotshall bequest 

1870 births
1935 deaths
American civil engineers
19th-century American engineers
20th-century American engineers